
Year 247 (CCXLVII) was a common year starting on Friday (link will display the full calendar) of the Julian calendar. At the time, it was known as the Year of the Consulship of Philippus and Severus (or, less frequently, year 1000 Ab urbe condita). The denomination 247 for this year has been used since the early medieval period, when the Anno Domini calendar era became the prevalent method in Europe for naming years.

Events 
 By place 
 Roman Empire 
 Rome becomes 1,000 years old. The 1,000th anniversary is commemorated with the Ludi Saeculares festivals, celebrated throughout the Roman Empire.
 Marcus Julius Philippus Augustus and his 10-year-old son Marcus Julius Philippus Caesar become Roman Consuls.
 The Goths appear on the lower Danube frontier; they invade Ukraine and Romania.
 Emperor Philip the Arab marks the millennium of Rome by holding the Ludi Saeculares.
 The last of the two Councils of Arabia in the Roman Christian Church is held in Bostra, Arabia Petraea.

 Asia 
 Himiko of Yamataikoku, in Japan, begins a war against King Himikoku of Kunukoku.
 Cheomhae becomes king of the Korean kingdom of Silla.

Births 
 Pan Yue, Chinese poet and writer of the Jin Dynasty (d. 300)
 Prisca, Roman empress and wife of Diocletian (d. 315)

Deaths 
 Abba Arikha, Babylonian Jewish scholar and rabbi (b. 175)
 Bu Zhi (or Zishan), Chinese general, official and statesman
 Xiang Lang (or Juda), Chinese general, official and politician
Zhang Chunhua, wife of Sima Yi, regent of the Cao Wei state (b. 189)

References